This is a list of list of supermarket chains in Ecuador currently operating. As of May 2012, there are 390 supermarkets in Ecuador; 117 of them are located in Guayaquil and 78 are located in Quito.

Major chains
 Corporación La Favorita operates:
 Supermaxi (35 locations as of 2016)
 Megamaxi (12 locations as of 2016)
 Akí (38 locations as of 2016)
 Gran Akí (17 locations as of 2016)
 Súper Akí (5 locations as of 2016)
 Corporación El Rosado operates:
 Mi Comisariato (32 locations as of 2012)
 Hipermarket (9 locations as of 2008)
 Mini (11 locations in Guayaquil, as of 2013)
 Tía SA operates:
 Tía (158 locations as of 2013)

Other chains
 El Rancho (4 locations as of 2012)
 Fernández (7 locations as of 2012)
 La Española (4 locations as of 2012)
 Santa María (6 locations as of 2005)

References 

Supermarkets
Ecuador